Baljit Singh Jalal Usma is an Indian politician and belongs to the ruling Shiromani Akali Dal party. He is a member of the Punjab Legislative Assembly and represents Jandiala.

Family
His father's name is Amar Singh. His wife's name is Gurinder Kaur Jalalusman and his son's name is GuruverJIt Singh.

Political career
Jalal Usma was elected to the Punjab Legislative Assembly from Jandiala in 2012.
Now, he is appointed new RTS Commissioner Punjab.

References

Living people
Shiromani Akali Dal politicians
Indian Sikhs
Punjab, India MLAs 2012–2017
Year of birth missing (living people)
People from Amritsar district
Place of birth missing (living people)